Toby Caulfeild may refer to:

 Toby Caulfeild, 1st Baron Caulfeild, English army officer
 Toby Caulfeild, 3rd Baron Caulfeild, Anglo-Irish politician
 Toby Caulfeild (1694–1740), Irish MP for Tulsk from 1727 to 1740
 Toby Caulfeild (1750–1772), Irish MP for Tulsk from 1771 to 1772